The following is a list of episodes for the Australian fly-on-the-wall documentary series, The Family:

It is the Australian version of the British series of the same name.

, 8 episodes of The Family have aired.

Episodes

Series 1: The Cardamones (2011-2012)
The first series will follow the Cardamone family through their daily lives, consisting of father Angelo, mother Josephine, and their three sons - David (20), Stefan (18), and Adrian (14). The Cardamone family had allowed 35 remote-controlled cameras to, day and night, follow their every move for three months.

References 

Family (2011 TV series)